Ravindra Vijay is an Indian actor who primarily appears in Tamil and Telugu films. After beginning his career as a theatre actor, Ravindra had a career breakthrough with appearances in Odu Raja Odu (2018) and Uma Maheshwara Ugra Roopasya (2020).

Career 
Born and raised in Bangalore, Ravindra is a polyglot and is fluent in Kannada, Tamil, Telugu and English. He completed a medical degree at Bangalore Medical College and Research Institute and is a qualified doctor. During his time as a student, he took on acting as a hobby and worked on college productions. In 2005, he joined the Bengaluru-based theatre troupe Rafiki, and began working on street plays. Soon after he quit his career as a doctor, Ravindra took on odd jobs to earn, and briefly worked at an oil rig. By 2011, he became a full-time theatre actor.

In the mid-2010s, he moved to Chennai and joined the theatre troupe, Perch. He acted in several of the collective's plays such as Under the Mangosteen Tree, which was inspired by Vaikom Muhammad Basheer's short stories. He also appeared in the plays How to Skin a Giraffe and Jujubee, a play for children. He is part of the trio that performs Kira Kozhambu, a play based on writer Ki Rajanarayanan's folk tales. Vijay acted in the play with Anandsami and Kalieaswari Srinivasan in Coimbatore. and re-enacted the same play with Maya S. Krishnan reprising Srinivasan's part in Chennai. The play solely featured the three actors and a bench. The play was based on Ki. Rajanarayanan's collection of short stories titled Nattuppura Kadhai Kalanjiyam with Anandsami reprising his role from the original play. A critic stated that "Actors Anand Sami, Maya S. Krishnan and Ravindra Vijay were in their elements with their seamless blend of art and entertainment".

Thereafter, he received an offer to appear as the brother of Nassar's character in Nishanth Ravindaran's black comedy film Odu Raja Odu (2018). He then continued to work on films, notably appearing in Kamal Haasan's production Kadaram Kondan (2019) and Dharala Prabhu (2020). Ravindra appeared in the Telugu film Uma Maheshwara Ugra Roopasya (2020), portraying the character of Jognath, the catalyst for the film's revenge-based narrative. The popularity of his role in the film led to audience creating memes on the character.

In 2021, Ravindra was seen in Amazon Prime's The Family Man portraying a Chennai-based intelligence officer.

Filmography

Television

References

External links 

21st-century Indian dramatists and playwrights
21st-century Indian male actors
Indian male film actors
Indian male stage actors
Living people
Male actors from Bangalore
Male actors in Hindi cinema
Male actors in Tamil cinema
Male actors in Telugu cinema
Tamil male actors
Year of birth missing (living people)